The Macarao National Park Is a protected area with the status of a national park located in the Macarao, San Pedro and Jarillo rivers, in the north of the South American country of Venezuela. Its extension of 15,000 hectares covers part of the Capital District and Miranda State. The area was declared National Park in 1973.

It constitutes a zone of protection of hydrographic resources that contributes to satisfy the drinking water needs of the city of Caracas.

It is characterized by a mountainous relief that forms part of the Cordillera de la Costa, the highest point of which is the Alto de Ño León. It has facilities to facilitate sports, scientific and educational excursions.

Gallery

See also
List of national parks of Venezuela
Mochima National Park

References

National parks of Venezuela
Protected areas established in 1973
1973 establishments in Venezuela
Geography of Miranda (state)
Geography of Capital District (Venezuela)